Athens General Hospital 'Evangelismos' is one of the largest public hospitals in Greece. It is located in a sub-neighbourhood of Kolonaki named after it, Evangelismos.

Construction of the building began on 25 March 1881 (architect Gerasimos Metaxas) and was finished exactly three years later on 25 March 1884, when it opened to the public on 16 April. Until 1983, the hospital was run as a charitable organization, but in that year it was nationalized and became part of the public health system. 

The nearby Athens Metro station Evangelismos is named after it.

References

1884 establishments in Greece
Hospitals in Athens
Central Athens (regional unit)
Hospital buildings completed in 1884
Hospitals established in 1884